Nipponotrophon is a genus of sea snails, marine gastropod mollusks in the subfamily Trophoninae of the family Muricidae, the murex snails or rock snails.

Species
Species within the genus Nipponotrophon include:
 Nipponotrophon barbarae Houart & Héros, 2016
 Nipponotrophon echinus (Dall, 1918)
 Nipponotrophon elegantissimus (Shikama, 1971)
 Nipponotrophon exquisitus Houart, Vermeij & Wiedrick, 2019
 Nipponotrophon gorgon (Dall, 1913)
 Nipponotrophon magnificus (Golikov & Sirenko, 1992)
 Nipponotrophon makassarensis Houart, 1984
 Nipponotrophon pagodus (Hayashi & Habe, 1965)
 Nipponotrophon shingoi (Tiba, 1981)

Species brought into synonymy
 Nipponotrophon bondarevi Houart, 1995: synonym of Scabrotrophon bondarevi (Houart, 1995) (original combination)
 Nipponotrophon elongatus (Hu & Lee, 1991): synonym of Nipponotrophon elegantissimus (Shikama, 1971)
 Nipponotrophon jungi K.-Y. Lai, 2008: synonym of Scabrotrophon chunfui Houart & Lan, 2001 
 Nipponotrophon regina Houart, 1986: synonym of Scabrotrophon regina (Houart, 1986) (original combination)
 Nipponotrophon scitulus (Dall, 1891): synonym of Scabrotrophon scitulus (Dall, 1891)
 Nipponotrophon stuarti (E. A. Smith, 1880): synonym of Scabrotrophon stuarti (E. A. Smith, 1880)

References

 Kuroda, T.; Habe, T.; Oyama, K. (1971). The sea shells of Sagami Bay. Maruzen Co., Tokyo. xix, 1-741 (Japanese text), 1-489 (English text), 1-51 (Index), pls 1-121.

 
Trophoninae